The R569 is a Regional Route in South Africa.

Route
Its western origin is the R538. It heads east for about 8 kilometres, ending at the Numbi Gate of the Kruger National Park.

References

Regional Routes in Mpumalanga